Ectopsocus axillaris is a species of Psocoptera from the Ectopsocidae family that can be found in Great Britain and Ireland. The species are brownish-black coloured and is similar to Bertkauia lucifuga.

Habitat 
The species feed on beech, cherry laurel, Chinese juniper, elder, hawthorn and oak. They also feed on abandoned wasp nests that can be seen from bracket fungus.

References 

Ectopsocidae
Insects described in 1969
Psocoptera of Europe